Brigadier Archibald Bentley Beauman CBE DSO and Bar (30 November 1888 – 22 March 1977) was a British Army officer, who at the start of the Second World War, raised and commanded an improvised force of second-line troops called the Beauman Division, in an attempt to stem the German Blitzkrieg during the Battle of France.

Early life and First World War
Beauman was born in the Paddington area of London on 30 November 1888, the son of Bentley Martin Beauman (or Baumann), a stockbrokers agent and his wife Estelle (née Beddington). His younger brother was Eric Bentley Beauman (1891–1989),  a Royal Naval Air Service pilot and mountaineer.

Educated at Windlesham House School, Malvern College and the Royal Military College, Sandhurst, Beauman was commissioned as a second lieutenant into the 2nd Battalion, South Staffordshire Regiment in 1908. Having served in South Africa before the First World War, Beauman's battalion was amongst the first units of the British Expeditionary Force (BEF) which went to France in August 1914: the "Old Contemptibles". After being invalided home in November 1914, he returned to the front in January 1915 when he served as Staff Captain, Deputy Assistant Adjutant and Quarter Master General, and then acting lieutenant colonel of the 1st Battalion of the South Staffordshires. In May 1918, he took command of the 69th Brigade on the Italian Front. He was made a Companion of the Distinguished Service Order (DSO) for an action during the Battle of Festubert on 16 May 1915, when he commanded the leading company of his battalion in an assault on enemy trenches; after reaching the line allotted to his battalion, his company held the position for three days under intense artillery fire. Beauman received a Bar to his DSO in November 1917, for an action in which he re-deployed his own battalion to support another on his right which was "in difficulties" during an enemy attack. The citation states that he "proved himself to be a leader of exceptional capability". He was also mentioned in despatches six times and was awarded two Italian medals.

Between the wars
Remaining in the army after the war, Beauman served at the Staff College, Camberley, initially as a student and then as a General Staff Officer (GSO) in India, as Chief Instructor at the Royal Military Academy Woolwich, and commanded the 1st Battalion, York and Lancaster Regiment. Following a spell as the Chief Instructor in the Small Arms School Corps at Netheravon, he took command of the  15th Infantry Brigade which was deployed to suppress the 1936–1939 Arab revolt in Palestine; Beauman was made a Commander of the Order of the British Empire for his services there in 1937. In 1938, Beauman became an aide-de-camp (ADC) to King George VI and following his retirement in October of that year, was made an Honorary brigadier.

Second World War
On the outbreak of the Second World War, Beauman returned to active service and was appointed Commanding Officer Northern Area with the British Expeditionary Force (BEF) in France, with the rank of (acting) brigadier. Based at Rouen, the main role of his command was managing logistics within the Lines of Communication area. This area was divided from the "forward area" by the River Somme but included a coastal strip up to Dunkirk. With the start of the German offensive in May 1940, Beauman was ordered by Major-General de Fonblanque, the General Officer Commanding Lines of Communication Troops, to strengthen his local defences. He formed a small mobile force, known as "Beauforce", consisting of four Territorial infantry battalions that had been intended to defend communications and undertake pioneer work. On 27 May, Beauman was promoted to (temporary) major-general and ordered to form a new division from "Beauforce" and a similar formation called "Vicforce", together with a third unit called "Digforce" which was composed of infantry reservists that were serving with the Auxiliary Military Pioneer Corps. The new formation was called the "Beauman Division"; this was the only example of a British division being named after its commander since the Peninsular War.

Although supported only by a few field guns that had been under repair in base depots, some of them lacking sights, the division was ordered to defend a 55-mile (89 km) line defined by the small rivers Andelle and Béthune in Upper Normandy. On 8 June, the 5th and 7th Panzer Divisions attacked towards Rouen. Despite desperate fighting, the line was penetrated first at Forges-les-Eaux and then in many other places, so that by that night, Beauman Division had been forced to withdraw across the Seine. The division was eventually evacuated from Cherbourg on 17 June, during Operation Aerial. On arrival in England, the division was dispersed; an entry in the London Gazette for 16 August 1940 says: "Colonel A B Beauman, CBE, DSO, relinquishes the acting rank of Major-General on ceasing to command a Division – 21st July 1940." He was mentioned in despatches for his services.

In 1941, he was appointed Commanding Officer of Catterick Garrison and in 1943 became the District Officer Commanding North Riding District, before finally resuming his retirement in October 1944.

Family life
Archibald Beauman married Eva Dorothy Dunn in 1928. They had a daughter and a son, Donald Beauman, a Formula Two motor racing driver who was killed on 9 July 1955 at the Leinster Trophy race at Wicklow, Ireland, when his Connaught A-type car crashed. Eva died in 1949 and he married Barbara Arnold in 1952. In retirement, Beauman pursued his interest in horse racing, becoming Vice-Chairman of the Racehorse Owners' Association in 1959.

Bibliography
 With the 38th in France and Italy: Being a Record of the Doings of the 1st Battalion South Staffordshire Regiment, from 26th September, 1916, to 26th May, 1918, F H Bull & E Wiseman, 1919.
 Common Mistakes in the Solution of Tactical Problems and how to Avoid Them: Hints to Officers Studying for the Staff College and Promotion Examinations, Hugh Rees Limited, London, 1925.
 A Short Outline Of Modern Tactics, Hugh Rees Limited, London, 1939.
 Then a Soldier (autobiography), P R Macmillan, 1960.

References

External links
British Army Officers 1939−1945
Generals of World War II
Imperial War Museum Interview

1888 births
1977 deaths
British Army generals of World War II
British Army personnel of World War I
British Army brigadiers of World War II
British military personnel of the 1936–1939 Arab revolt in Palestine
Commanders of the Order of the British Empire
Companions of the Distinguished Service Order
Graduates of the Royal Military College, Sandhurst
Graduates of the Staff College, Camberley
People educated at Malvern College
People from Paddington
Military personnel from London
Recipients of the Silver Medal of Military Valor
Recipients of the War Cross for Military Valor
South Staffordshire Regiment officers
York and Lancaster Regiment officers
People educated at Windlesham House School
Academics of the Royal Military Academy, Woolwich